Nighthawks is a 1981 American neo-noir action crime thriller film directed by Bruce Malmuth and starring Sylvester Stallone, Billy Dee Williams, Lindsay Wagner, Persis Khambatta, Nigel Davenport, and Rutger Hauer. Its score was composed by Keith Emerson. The film was noted for production problems. It’s also noted as Stallone’s first action film in the main role.

The film follows a pair of international terrorists who come to New York City and the police detectives who, as part of a newly-formed anti-terrorism squad, are tasked with identifying and neutralising them.

Plot 

Three armed assailants attack a woman who turns out to be NYCPD Detective Sergeant Deke DaSilva of the Street Crimes Unit in disguise. His partner, Detective Sergeant Matthew Fox, immobilizes two of the assailants; Deke chases the third upstairs to a subway-station platform, taunts him, and incapacitates him with a scarf. That day in London, terrorist Heymar Reinhardt (alias Wulfgar) bombs a department store. In New York City, DaSilva and Fox serve a high-risk warrant in the Bronx. They raid a drug-distribution spot, where they discover corrupt police officers among the dealers. After the arrests DaSilva meets his estranged wife, Irene, and tells her he loves her; although she initially rebuffs his advances, they eventually reconcile.

Wulfgar meets a member of his network at a party to receive travel documents and money. Suspicious of the delivery man, Wulfgar kills him and three Metropolitan Police Service officers sent to arrest him. He escapes, and the police superintendent berates lead investigator Inspector Hartman. In Paris, Wulfgar meets his partner, Shakka, and learns that his handlers are ostracizing him because the bombing killed a number of children. Wulfgar undergoes facial surgery to alter his appearance and decides to move his terrorist campaign to New York City.

Lt. Munafo transfers DaSilva and Fox to the newly formed ATAC (Anti-Terrorist Action Command) squad, where they meet Hartman. Hartman and DaSilva clash, since Hartman believes that American police are not ruthless enough to deal with a terrorist such as Wulfgar. Although he hesitates to condone killing Wulfgar, DaSilva absorbs his new training and begins to understand the terrorist. In New York City, Wulfgar moves in with a flight attendant named Pam and kills her when she discovers his arsenal. Acting on a tip, Munafo orders DaSilva and Fox to search every nightclub the flight attendant had visited. They find Wulfgar in a nightclub and, after a shootout and foot chase through the subway, Wulfgar first takes a woman hostage and uses her as a human shield, preventing DaSilva from shooting. Wulfgar then escapes by slashing Fox's face with a knife, enraging DaSilva, who vows to kill Wulfgar. At the hospital, Fox admonishes DaSilva for not shooting.

The ATAC squad guards a United Nations function at the Metropolitan Museum of Art. Shakka, infiltrating the party in disguise, corners Hartman on an escalator and kills him. After hijacking a tram car, Wulfgar executes the wife of the French ambassador while DaSilva watches from a hovering police helicopter. Wulfgar demands that DaSilva board the tramway to receive an infant that he wishes to be taken to safety. DaSilva is winched up to the aerial tram and confronts Wulfgar, demanding to know why Wulfgar killed the woman. Wulfgar says that he killed her because he wanted to; considering himself a speaker for people who cannot speak for themselves, he says that all people are victims.

The police agree to Wulfgar's demands for a bus to escort him and the hostages to an airport, where a jet will be waiting. Wulfgar and Shakka hide among the hostages. As they board the bus, DaSilva plays a hidden recording of a Hartman lecture denouncing Shakka. Shakka, enraged, breaks away from the hostages and Fox shoots her with a sniper rifle. Wulfgar escapes by driving the bus off a ramp into the East River, but after searching the area, the police cannot find him.

At Wulfgar's safe-house, ATAC finds detailed information on the individual team members and Irene. Wulfgar breaks into Irene's home, tracking her into the kitchen as she does dishes. As he sneaks up behind to kill her, "Irene" suddenly turns to face Wulfgar, revealing DaSilva in disguise. As DaSilva aims his revolver at Wulfgar, Wulfgar lunges at him; DaSilva fires twice at the terrorist, sending his body crashing into the street. DaSilva walks out of the house and sits beside Wulfgar's lifeless body on the front steps of Irene's house.

Cast

Production

Development and writing
The story was originally planned as The French Connection III by screenwriter David Shaber at Twentieth Century Fox, with Gene Hackman's Popeye Doyle teamed up with a wisecracking cop (possibly played by Richard Pryor). When Hackman was reluctant to make a third film as Doyle, the idea was scrapped; Universal acquired the rights to the storyline, which Shaber reworked into Nighthawks.

The film had two working titles: Attack and Hawks, and pre-production began in 1979. Principal photography began January 1980 (when the final draft of the script was completed), and production ended in April 1980. Because of problems with Stallone's and the studio's interference in post-production, the film was heavily re-edited and was released a year after it was finished.

The original director was Gary Nelson—who had directed the Disney films Freaky Friday (1976) and The Black Hole (1979)—but he was dismissed from the project after a week of production and was not credited. His replacement, Bruce Malmuth, had only one previous film to his credit: a segment of the 1975 portmanteau comedy, Fore Play. Malmuth, en route from Los Angeles to New York City, was unable to make the first day of shooting after Nelson's removal and Stallone shot a scene for one day (the chase in the subway). According to the Directors Guild of America, "Anyone signed to work on a movie before the director was engaged cannot replace a fired director, except in an emergency"; arbitration resulted in a fine. In preparation for their roles as New York City police officers, Billy Dee Williams and Sylvester Stallone spent several weeks working at night with the New York Street Crimes Unit.

Pre-production
Nighthawks marked the American debut of Dutch actor Rutger Hauer. To accept the role of Wulfgar, Hauer turned down a better-paying role in Sphinx, a 1981 adventure film directed by Franklin J. Schaffner. His mother and his best friend died during the film's production, and he returned to the Netherlands for their funerals.

The first scene which Hauer filmed was his death scene, in which he was injured twice. A squib meant to simulate a gunshot exploded on the wrong side, severely burning him; a cable which yanked him (simulating the force of being shot) was pulled too hard, straining his back. Hauer later learned that the cable was pulled forcefully according to Stallone's order, and their relationship was then marked by disagreements. Although stories about their on-set arguments are still told by fans of the film and the actors, Hauer has said in interviews that he did not take the disagreements personally and the greatest problem during filming was the film's difficulty.

In a 1993 interview Stallone praised Hauer's performance. It was a little bit ahead of its time in that I was dealing with urban terrorism. Now, with the World Trade Center [the 1993 World Trade Center bombing], it's happening. At the time, people couldn't relate to it, and the studio [Universal] didn't believe in it. Rutger Hauer's performance held it together — he was an excellent villain.

According to Hauer, Nighthawks was a missed opportunity and the issue of international terrorism could have been handled more accurately: "We had only to play tags – the written story was much more dangerous".

The subway train used in the chase sequence was retired IND equipment which was preserved as a museum train. Car number 1802 (the last prewar New York City Subway car built) is owned by Railway Preservation Corporation and remains in New York City, where it operates several times a year on museum fan trips with other preserved cars. Number 1802 has since been scrapped. The IND Hoyt-Schermerhorn station in Brooklyn was used as the 57th and 42nd Street stations; a Hoyt-Schermerhorn sign is briefly visible when Stallone tries to pry the doors open as the train pulls out of the station. The train ran on an unused outer track leading from the Court Street station, now the New York Transit Museum.

The London department store blown up at the beginning of the film was Arding & Hobbs in Clapham Junction, which belonged to the Allders group at the time. The store is now owned by Debenhams, and during the 2011 England riots its windows were again smashed.

Stunts
Nighthawks stunt coordinator was Dar Robinson. Stallone insisted on performing his own stunts; according to actor Nigel Davenport in an interview for the BBC's Wogan, Stallone performed the scene in which he was winched up to the Roosevelt Island Tramway without a double. About the film's stunts, Stallone posted on the Ain't It Cool News website:

The stunts in the film were pretty extraordinary because they were invented along the way. Running through the tunnels of an un-built subway station was very dangerous, but exciting and we were only given one hour to do it. So that made for an interesting evening. Hanging from the cable car was probably one of the more dangerous stunts I was asked to perform because it was untested and I was asked to hold a folding Gerber knife in my left hand so if the cable were to snap, and I survived the 230 foot fall into the East River with its ice cold 8 mile an hour current, I could cut myself free from the harness because the cable when stretched out weighed more than 300 lbs. I tell you this because it's so stupid to believe that I would survive hitting the water so to go beyond that is absurd. So I actually thought the smart move would be to commit hari-kari on the way down and let the cards fold as they may. P.S. Several years later this cable did snap while testing it on a 100lb bag of sand.

In a 1980 interview with Roger Ebert, Stallone mentioned problems with stunts he wanted to perform himself in Nighthawks. In the scene where he jumps onto a moving train and kicks out the wire-reinforced window, the window broke easily and knocked him off balance. Stallone has had a lifelong fear of heights and said about the helicopter stunt, "I've never been so scared in my life". According to the actor, he spent 15 weeks in near-total seclusion in his hotel room between scenes and it was the most stressful time of his life.

Post-production 
Before its theatrical release, Nighthawks was edited for violence by Universal Studios and the MPAA. Among the scenes cut was a longer disco shootout, and Wulfgar's death scene was heavily edited.

Stallone also had a hand in re-editing the film. According to Frank Sanello's book, Stallone: A Rocky Life, two versions of Nighthawks were shown to test audiences: one emphasizing Stallone's character and the other emphasizing Hauer's. Although the version emphasizing Hauer was better received by audiences, Stallone removed some of Hauer's scenes from the film's final version.

Stallone posted on the Ain't It Cool News website that Nighthawks "was a very difficult film to make namely because no one believed that urban terrorism would ever happen in New York, and thus felt that the story was far fetched. Nighthawks was an even better film before the studio lost faith in it and cut it to pieces. What was in the missing scenes was extraordinary acting by Rutger Hauer, Lindsay Wagner, and the finale was a blood fest that rivaled the finale of Taxi Driver. But it was a blood fest with a purpose".

In 2021 interview for Collider while he was promoting his new director's cut of Rocky IV (1985), Stallone said how some of his other films he would have loved to re-edit back to their original versions were Rocky V (1990), Paradise Alley (1978), and Nighthawks. He also praised the original cut of Nighthawks as superior to the final theatrical version.

Lindsay Wagner said in an interview that Stallone took over the film because of production problems:

He was really incredible. That film – I mean, history has shown that he's so talented in so many different ways. He had made "Rocky" obviously before that [directing Rocky II in 1979]. But, it was just incredible. They had some difficulties. Whatever they were, I wasn't privy to the inside information about it. We started with one director, and all of the sudden there was some problems, and Sylvester ended up having to take over the film and he ended up directing it. So just spontaneously, he just jumped into that role, and after [that] directed [it]. And, it was incredible watching him and his multi-talented self whip that film into shape. It was quite educational in some ways. But, just kind of awe inspiring watching him work on so many levels at one time. That's not easy. Not many actors can do that.

Reception

Box office
The film recovered its $5-million budget worldwide, grossing $14.9 million in North America and $5 million abroad.

Critical response
Variety called the film "an exciting cops and killers yarn".
In her review for The New York Times, Janet Maslin praised Hauer's performance: "Mr. Hauer's terrorist, in particular, is a sharply drawn character who acts as a driving force within the movie's scheme. Sadism and bloodlessness are his only identifiable characteristics, and yet he behaves memorably wherever he goes". Time magazine's Richard Schickel sharply criticized the film: "Nighthawks is so moronically written and directed, so entirely without wit or novelty, that there is plenty of time to wonder about its many missing explanations". In The Globe and Mail, Jay Scott wrote that the film "has a dirty job to do and does it. That is not an endorsement. Thumbscrews and cattle prods are real good at what they do, too". According to Newsweek Jack Kroll, "This is one of those films that isn't a film but some repulsively complicated business deal". In The Washington Post, Gary Arnold described the film as "an aggressively shallow police thriller pitting New York undercover cops against international terrorists, suggests what The Day of the Jackal might have looked like if filmed by the producers of Baretta. In order to facilitate a grandstanding, harebrained heroic role assigned to Sylvester Stallone, the filmmakers brush off every opportunity for intelligent dramatization and authentic suspense that the plot would seem to possess".

The film has a 71% approval rating on the review aggregation website Rotten Tomatoes based on 24 reviews.

Remake
In July 2019, it was announced that a remake was in development from Balboa Productions. By May 2020, Sylvester Stallone announced that a reboot television series is currently in development. The project will be a joint-venture production between Universal Television and Balboa Productions, and will be released as a Peacock exclusive television series.

References

External links 
 Alternative DVD commentary for Nighthawks
 
 
 
 
 
 
 
 

1981 films
1981 action thriller films
1980s crime thriller films
1980s crime action films
American action thriller films
American crime action films
American crime thriller films
Cross-dressing in American films
1980s English-language films
1980s French-language films
1980s German-language films
Swedish-language films
Universal Pictures films
Films directed by Bruce Malmuth
Films set in New York City
Fictional portrayals of the New York City Police Department
Films about terrorism in the United States
Films about the New York City Police Department
American police detective films
Films set in London
Films set in Paris
Films set in 1980
Films set in 1981
Films shot in London
Films shot in New York City
Films shot in Paris
Films scored by Keith Emerson
Rail transport films
1981 directorial debut films
1980s American films